American Shaolin is a 1992 American martial arts film directed by Lucas Lowe and starring (among others) Reese Madigan, Kim Chan and Daniel Dae Kim.

Plot
During a martial arts tournament, the American finalist Drew Carson (Reese Madigan) is humiliated by his opponent, ruthless and sadistic kickboxer Trevor Gottitall (Trent Bushey) who pantses him during the match. To add to the insult, Drew's teacher Master Kwan (Kim Chan) confesses that he is not—as he had claimed—a Shaolin monk, and therefore he had not passed on the actual knowledge of Shaolin kung fu to Drew. Determined to learn the actual art to prevent another such situation, Drew departs for China and arrives at the Shaolin Temple. At first, the monks do not let him enter, but with the help of a pretty tea shop waitress, Ashena (Alice Zhang Hung), and an old monk (Henry O) who gives him a decisive advise, he waits outside of the temple for a week, after which he manages to be admitted. The old monk also turns out to be the abbot of the temple, Master San De, and he and his stern taskmaster train Drew and a number of other young apprentices in the ways of the Shaolin.

At first Drew causes much trouble as his American teenage temperament clashes with the tranquility within the temple and with his fellow student, Gao (Daniel Dae Kim), but under the rigorous physical and mental training he both improves his fighting skills and learns the meaning of discipline, humility, and patience. He makes friends with Gao and also manages to pass the two final tests: the Test of Spirituality, and the Test of the Chamber. Accepted as a full-fledged member of the Shaolin Monastery, he accompanies—along with Ashena—a delegation of his fellow students and the abbot to a martial arts tournament in Shanghai.

At the tournament, Drew encounters Trevor once again. Trevor taunts Drew before proceeding with this match against Gao. Gao initially gains the upper hand, but Trevor resorts to his dirty fighting techniques and injures Gao. With Gao pinned against the ropes, Trevor demands a match against the "American Shaolin". Drew rises, but sits down again, refusing to fight Trevor on the principle of non-violence and selflessness. Infuriated, Trevor continues to beat up Gao and hurls him out of the ring. Encouraged by Master San De, Drew finally enters the ring to fight Trevor. Trevor immediately used dirty tricks again, but Drew prevails and even offers his hand to the defeated Trevor. The crowd voices their support for Shaolin, and Master San De declares that "this is the future of Shaolin".

Cast
 Reese Madigan as Drew Carson
 Trent Bushey as Trevor Gottitall
 Daniel Dae Kim as Gao Yun
 Kim Chan as Master Kwan, Drew's original teacher
 Billy Chang as Li
 Alice Zhang Hung as Ashena
 Cliff Lenderman as D.S. (short for "Drill Sergeant" as he was the head teacher of the newcomers at Shaolin)
 Henry O as Master San De, the Abbot of Shaolin Temple (credited under his birth name of Zhang Zhi Yen)
 Jean Louisa Kelly as Maria
 Andrew Shue as Competitor
 Tokey Hill as Trevor's Coach
 Marcos Antonio Miranda as Coach
 Paul Mormando as Trevor's Sparring Partner

Production

 During the only  day of filming within the walls of the Forbidden City, the entire  film cast and crew were inexplicably ordered to leave by the government, despite having been granted permission to shoot there. The principal photography on American Shaolin took place from May through late August 1991, two years after the Tiananmen Square protests of 1989, and the filming, particularly within Beijing itself, was under heavy governmental scrutiny.
 In the United States, the film was released on video by Academy Entertainment as American Shaolin: King of the Kickboxers 2.  Although both this film and The King of the Kickboxers share the same director, they are completely unrelated in terms of plot and characters. The film has never been released on DVD in the United States.
 The film was the debut performance of Daniel Dae Kim, who at the time was a Taekwondo black belt. 
 The DVD is available in Australia.

References

External links
 

1992 films
1992 martial arts films
American martial arts films
1990s English-language films
Martial arts tournament films
1990s American films